Pepesana Patafilo (born 29 May 1996 in New Zealand) is a New Zealand born Samoan rugby union player who plays for the  in Super Rugby. His playing position is wing. He was named in the Hurricanes squad for the 2021 Super Rugby Aotearoa season. He was also a member of the  2020 Mitre 10 Cup squad.

Reference list

External links
itsrugby.co.uk profile

1996 births
Samoan rugby union players
Living people
Rugby union wings
Waikato rugby union players
Wellington rugby union players
Hurricanes (rugby union) players
Crusaders (rugby union) players